"She Does It Right" is a song by the band Dr. Feelgood. Recorded in 1974 it appeared on their debut album, Down by the Jetty.

"She Does It Right" was also issued as a single in the UK in March 1975. It failed to reach the UK Singles Chart.  Written by Wilko Johnson, and produced by Vic Maile, the song was Dr. Feelgood's second single release, following their debut with "Roxette". The b-side of the record, "I Don't Mind", was also penned by Johnson.
 
"She Does It Right" was also later included in Dr. Feelgood's 1997's compilation album, Twenty Five Years of Dr. Feelgood.

During an interview with Wilko Johnson, Songwriting Magazine described the track as "three and a half minutes of proto-punk heaven".

References

1975 singles
Music in Southend-on-Sea
Dr. Feelgood (band) songs
1975 songs
Song recordings produced by Vic Maile
United Artists Records singles
Songs written by Wilko Johnson